Gauci Tower is a tower in Naxxar, Malta. It was built before 1548 by the Gauci family. Today, the tower is in good condition.

History
Gauci Tower was built sometime before 1548 by Francesco Gauci to protect his family from corsair raids. Construction cost a total of 400 scudi. In 1548, it was requisitioned by the Order of Saint John, who ruled the Maltese Islands, to house the Captain of the Naxxar militia. Gauci petitioned against this move, and the tower was returned to him on 16 May 1548. Eventually, the Order built the nearby Captain's Tower to house the Captain of the militia.

The tower is quite small, and it has a square plan, with its lower half being slightly more pronounced. A number of box machicolations are located at the crest of its high parapet. It also has musketry loopholes and vision slits. A townhouse, which was also built by Gauci, is located next to the tower.

By the late 17th century, Gauci Tower had lost most of its defensive value. The Chapel of St. Paul was built in front of it in 1696.

The tower and adjacent townhouse needed a lot of repairs and restoration, as they were uninhabited for multiple years. A lot of the construction materials had to be imported to the island. The most difficult renovation included dismantling the air-raid shelter on the ground floor of the tower, which had been used during WWII. This air-raid shelter was built by British forces during the war to protect Malta's highest judge, Sir Arturo Mercieca. In the tower, 30cm steel cement was cutting through the three arches, supported by giant pillars. On the 450th Birthday of the tower – May 16, 1998 – all restoration work was finally finished, and a ceremony led by the mayor of Naxxar led to the switching-on of the flood-light system of this beautiful tower and adjacent St. Pawl's Chapel.

Further reading
Women's Places (Itineraries). From Floriana to Naxxar via Sliema (Ch 19). p. 391.

References

External links

National Inventory of the Cultural Property of the Maltese Islands

Fortified towers in Malta
Towers completed in the 16th century
Naxxar
Limestone buildings in Malta
National Inventory of the Cultural Property of the Maltese Islands
Fortified houses in Malta
16th-century fortifications